Aida Navarro (born October 17, 1937), is a Venezuelan mezzo-soprano, born in Caracas.
 
She studied lyric singing in Venezuela, The U.S. and in Vienna, Austria. She excelled in many opera and chamber music presentations in Europe and Latin America. In 1967 she was awarded the Prize to the Best Chamber Music Performer in Rio de Janeiro. She was a co-founder of the Venezuelan music group Quinteto Contrapunto.

After being a part of the quintet for some years and performing in several other chamber music presentations and operas she dedicated her life to teaching lyric singing and became one of the most important figures in vocal education in Venezuela.

References 

Singers from Caracas
Venezuelan classical musicians
20th-century Venezuelan women singers
Venezuelan folk singers
1937 births
Living people